Shiroky is a rural locality (an urban-type settlement) in Raychikhinsk urban okrug, Amur Oblast, Russia. The population was 1,225 as of 2018. There are 34 streets.

Geography 
The village is located in the valley of the Kholodny Klyuch River, 10 km from Raychikhinsk.

References 

Rural localities in Raychikhinsk Urban Okrug